KCKL (95.9 FM) is a radio station broadcasting a country music format. Licensed to Malakoff, Texas, United States, the station serves the Athens, Malakoff and Cedar Creek Lake area of East Texas. The station is owned by High Plains Radio Network, through licensee HPRN Radio Network, LLC, and features programming from ABC Radio. They also broadcast local sports from area schools.

On December 30, 2016, Lake Country Radio filed to sell KCKL, KLVQ, and translator K233BE to Monte Spearman and Gentry Todd Spearman's High Plains Radio Network for $250,000. The transfer of license was approved and consummation of the sale occurred on June 9, 2017. In May 2018, KCKL celebrates its 34th year of providing local oriented news, Country music, and sports programming for the Athens Hornets.

References

External links

CKL
Country radio stations in the United States
Radio stations established in 1984
1984 establishments in Texas